The Waitomo Glowworm Caves attraction is a cave at Waitomo on the North Island of New Zealand. It is known for its population of Arachnocampa luminosa, a glowworm species found exclusively in New Zealand. This cave is part of the waitomo streamway system that includes the Ruakuri Cave, Lucky Strike, and Tumutumu Cave.

The attraction has a modern visitor centre at the entrance, largely designed in wood. There are organized tours that include a boat ride under the glowworms.

History
The name "Waitomo" comes from the Māori words wai, water and tomo, hole or shaft. The local Māori people had known about the caves for about a century before a local Māori, originally from Kawhia, Tane Tinorau, and English surveyors, Laurence Cussen and Fred Mace, were shown the entrance in 1884 and Tane and Fred did extensive explorations in 1887 and 1888. Their exploration was conducted with candlelight on a raft going into the cave where the stream goes underground (now the cave's tourist exit.)  As they began their journey, they came across the Glowworm Grotto and were amazed by the twinkling glow coming from the ceiling. As they travelled further into the cave by poling themselves towards an embankment, they were also astounded by the limestone formations.  These formations surrounded them in all shapes and sizes.

They returned many times after and Chief Tane independently discovered the upper level entrance to the cave, which is now the current entrance. Visitor access improved when the railway was extended to Ōtorohanga in 1887. By 1889 Tane Tinorau and his wife Huti had opened the cave to visitors and were leading groups for a small fee. Thomas Humphries, (Commissioner of Crown Lands and Chief Surveyor of Auckland 1889 – 1891) did a full study later the same year, noting graffiti had already been inscribed on the ‘most delicate portions’ of the cave, though noting "The natives are now taking great care of the caves", but recommending that government take over the cave to provide more visitor facilities. About 500 tourists visited the cave in the first two years. After years of attempts to buy the caves, the government used the Scenery Preservation Act 1903 and the Public Works Act 1905 to take them over for £625. In 1906, after an escalation in vandalism, the administration of the cave was taken over by the government. In 1910 the Waitomo Caves Hotel was built to house the many visitors.

Tourist Hotel Corporation, a state-owned business, took over in 1957. The hotel was sold to Southern Pacific Hotels Corporation in 1990 and, in 1994, they agreed a licence for the caves with DOC and the Māori owners, selling it to Tourism Holdings Limited in 1996.

In 1989, the land and cave were returned to the descendants of Chief Tane Tinorau and Huti who comprise many of the employees of the caves today. The descendants receive a percentage of the cave’s revenue and are involved in its management and development under the 1990 Waitomo Deed of Settlement.

Geology

Geological and volcanic activity has created around 300 known limestone caves in the Waitomo region over the last 30 million years.

The limestone formation in the Waitomo Glowworm Caves occurred when the region was still under the ocean about 30 million years ago.  The limestone is composed of fossilized corals, seashells, fish skeletons, and many small marine organisms on the sea beds.  Over millions of years, these fossilized rocks have been layered upon each other and compressed to create limestone and within the Waitomo region the limestone can be over 200 m thick.

The caves began to form when earth movement caused the hard limestone to bend and buckle under the ocean and rise above the sea floor.  As the rock was exposed to air, it separated and created cracks and weaknesses that allowed for water to flow through them dissolving the limestone and over millions of years large caves were formed.

The stalactites, stalagmites, and other cave formations grew from water dripping from the ceiling or flowing over the walls and leaving behind limestone deposits.  The stalagmites form upward from the floor while the stalactites form from the ceiling.  When these formations connect they are called pillars or columns and if they twist around each other they are called Helictite.  These cave decorations take millions of years to form given that the average stalactite grows one cubic centimetre every 100 years.

Biology
The most common animals in the caves are insects. This includes albino cave ants and giant crickets but the most renowned is the glowworm Arachnocampa luminosa. The adults are around the size of an average mosquito. However, there are several small underground lakes that were created by freshwater creeks or brooks which are home to New Zealand longfin eels.

The walls of the caves are covered with a variety of fungi including the cave flower (a distant relation to the genus Pleurotus) that is actually a mushroom-like fungus.

Cave monitoring
The glowworms of the Waitomo Glowworm Caves are closely guarded by a Scientific Advisory Group.  This group has automated equipment that continually monitors the air quality especially the carbon dioxide levels, rock and air temperature, and humidity. Data from this equipment is carefully analyzed by specialist staff. The advisory group uses the information to establish how the cave should be managed.  They determine if and when air flow patterns should be changed and how many people are allowed to visit the caves each day.

Guided tours 

The guided tour through the Waitomo Glowworm Caves brings the visitor through three different levels and begins at the top level of the cave and the Catacombs.  The levels are linked by the Tomo, which is a 16 m vertical shaft made of limestone.  The second level is called the Banquet Chamber.  This level is where early visitors stopped to eat and there is evidence of this in the smoke on the ceiling of the chamber.  From here it may be possible to link back to the upper level to see the largest formation called the Pipe Organ but on busy days this area is closed to the public because the build-up of carbon monoxide may be hazardous.

The third and final level goes down into the Cathedral, demonstration platform, and the jetty.  The Cathedral is an enclosed area with rough surfaces, now paved, and is about 18 m high, giving it good acoustics. A number of famous singers and choirs have performed here including Dame Kiri Te Kanawa.

The tour concludes with a boat ride through the Glowworm Grotto.  The boat takes the visitor onto the underground Waitomo River where the only light comes from the tiny glowworms creating a sky of living lights.

Location
The Waitomo Glowworm Caves are located in the Northern King Country region of the North Island of New Zealand, 12 km northwest of Te Kuiti.  This cave is about 2 hours south of Auckland, 1 hour south of Hamilton, and 2 hours west of Rotorua by car.  The directions to the Caves are to exit State Highway 3 onto Waitomo Caves Road and to continue on the road for about 8 km.

See also
 Waitomo Caves

References

External links

 Waitomo Caves Discovery Centre
 1889 visitor description

1889 establishments in New Zealand
Caves of New Zealand
Limestone caves
Show caves in New Zealand
Waitomo District
Places with bioluminescence
Tourist attractions in Waikato
Landforms of Waikato